Kelch proteins (and Kelch-like proteins) are a widespread group of proteins that contain multiple Kelch motifs. The kelch domain generally occurs as a set of five to seven kelch tandem repeats that form a β-propeller tertiary structure. Kelch-repeat β-propellers are generally involved in protein–protein interactions, though the large diversity of domain architectures and limited sequence identity between kelch motifs make characterisation of the kelch superfamily difficult.

Structure 
The N-terminus of several Kelch proteins contain other protein domains, including Discoidin, F-box, and Broad-complex, Tramtrack, Bric-a-Brac/Poxvirus Zinc finger (BTB/POZ) domains. Kelch proteins may also only have a β-propeller architecture. The BTB domain of kelch proteins (if present) allows the formation of homo- or heterodimers that mediate protein–protein interactions.

The C-terminus of Kelch proteins contains kelch repeats. Each kelch repeat is a sequence of 44–55 amino acids in length, usually occurring in clusters of 4 – 7 repeats.

Each kelch repeat forms a "blade" of the β-propeller fold, consisting of a four-stranded antiparallel β-sheet secondary structure, arranged radially around a central axis, packed onto its adjoining repeats via hydrophobic contacts.

Kelch-repeat β-propellers undergo a variety of binding interactions with other proteins, notably the actin filaments of a cell.

Function 
Kelch-like proteins are known to act as substrate adaptors for Cullin 3 ubiquitin ligases.

Organisms
The first Kelch protein (from which this family derives its name) was isolated from Drosophila, in which Kelch-mutant females lay sterile, cup-shaped eggs; The word Kelch is German for 'chalice, cup'. Kelch proteins have also been isolated in many other animals, plants, bacteria, fungi, and even virus (restricted to Poxviridae).

Human proteins containing Kelch motifs 
ATRN; ATRNL1; CCIN; ENC1; FBXO42;
GAN; HCFC1; HCFC2; IPP; IVNS1ABP; KBTBD10; KBTBD11; KBTBD2;
KBTBD3; KBTBD4; KBTBD5; KBTBD6; KBTBD7; KBTBD8; KEAP1;    
KIAA1900; KLHDC1; KLHDC2; KLHDC3; KLHDC4; KLHDC5; KLHDC6; KLHDC7A; KLHDC7B;
KLHDC8A; KLHDC8B; KLHDC9; KLHDC10; KLHL1; KLHL10; KLHL11; KLHL12; KLHL13;
KLHL14; KLHL15; KLHL17; KLHL18; KLHL2; KLHL20; KLHL21; KLHL22;
KLHL23; KLHL24; KLHL25; KLHL26; KLHL28; KLHL29; KLHL3; KLHL30;
KLHL31; KLHL32; KLHL34; KLHL4; KLHL40; KLHL5; KLHL6; KLHL7; KLHL8;
KLHL9; LZTR1; MEGF8; MKLN1; RABEPK; SARCOSIN;

References